The Hermitage and Monastery of Saint Peter Koriški is a ruin of the hermitage and monastery located in Koriša, Prizren municipality, Kosovo. The monastery and hermitage are on the same location.

History
The Monastery is an ancient cave dwelling that was abandoned in 1453 after the Turkish invasion. After the monastery was disbanded, the remains of St. Peter Koriški were moved to the monastery at Crna Reka in 1572.

The hermitage was a declared cultural monument on 16 December 1950, and registered as a Protected Monument of Culture in 1990 under the protection of the Republic of Serbia.

In February 2021, a group of four Kosovo Albanians was arrested by local police authorities for stealing archeological remains.

Gallery

Notes

References

Serbian Orthodox monasteries in Kosovo
Medieval Serbian sites in Kosovo
Religious buildings and structures in Prizren
Former religious buildings and structures in Kosovo
Cultural heritage of Kosovo
Cave monasteries
Cultural Monuments of Exceptional Importance (Serbia)
Former churches in Kosovo